Bulbophyllum psittacoglossum is a species of orchid in the genus Bulbophyllum. It was named (as Bolbophyllum psittacoglossum) by Heinrich Gustav Reichenbach in 1863.

References 

The Bulbophyllum-Checklist
The Internet Orchid Species Photo Encyclopedia

psittacoglossum